Should A Mother Tell? is a lost  1915 silent film drama directed by J. Gordon Edwards and starring Betty Nansen. The scenario was by future director Rex Ingram with the film being produced and distributed by Fox Film Corporation.

Cast

References

External links
 Should A Mother Tell? at IMDb.com

1915 films
Lost American films
American black-and-white films
Fox Film films
Films directed by J. Gordon Edwards
Silent American drama films
1915 drama films
American silent feature films
1915 lost films
Lost drama films
1910s American films